Tanum may refer to:

 Tanum Municipality in Sweden
 Tanum, Norway in Bærum, Norway
 Tanum (company), a Norwegian bookstore chain owned by Egmont
 Mintil language of Malaysia, also called Tanum or Tanɨm
 Tanum River of Malaysia